Force (born Clayton "Clay" Wilson, legally changed to Carl Walker) is a character appearing in American comic books published by Marvel Comics. The character first appears in Prince Namor, the Savage Sub-Mariner #67 (Nov. 1972) and was created by Steve Gerber and Don Heck.

A version of Clay Wilson appeared in the Marvel Cinematic Universe series The Punisher played by Tim Guinee.

Fictional character biography
Clayton Wilson is a graduate student at Empire State University working as a research assistant to scientist Dr. Damon Walters, who develops a prototype device for creating a protective force field. Wilson steals the prototype force field generator, creates a battle-suit that incorporates it, and adopts the alias "Force". The character then goes on a rampage through New York City until being defeated by Namor.

Force retreats and appears in the title Iron Man, having become a professional criminal, working for crime boss Justin Hammer in exchange for modifications to his suit. Force and a group of mercenaries hijack the yacht of industrialist Tony Stark (the alter ego of Iron Man) and take several hostages. Iron Man, however, tracks the yacht, defeats Force and his men and rescues the hostages.

Wilson eventually reappears in the title Iron Man, and decides to reform. Hammer, however, traps the character in the suit and threatens to kill him if he reneges on the agreement. Force flees and Hammer sends villains the Beetle, Blacklash, and Blizzard to kill him. Iron Man aids Force in stopping the villains, then lies to the authorities and advises that Wilson was killed in battle to placate Hammer. Wilson is provided with a new identity and employment with Barstow Electronics, a subsidiary of Stark Industries. Analysis of Force's armor reveals that elements of it were actually based on Stark's own designs, Stark bringing in Wilson to quickly ask him where he acquired that technology, thus setting in motion the events of the Armor Wars when he learns that Justin Hammer acquired some of Stark's plans thanks to a raid carried out by Spymaster. Wilson makes another brief appearance in the title Iron Man, impersonating the hero to assist Stark.

The character makes another appearance in Iron Man as part of the group the "Iron Legion", subsequently battling the giant robot Ultimo. Force then appears in the third volume of Iron Man, and after being blackmailed travels to the country Iraq to aid Stark once again.

Wilson reappears as Force during the Dark Reign storyline, arresting several villains employed by the criminal the Hood.

Powers, abilities, and equipment
Clayton Wilson designed and used a powered battle-suit incorporating the force field projector designed by Dr. Damon Walters. The suit also provides enhanced strength, flight and can generate an electric current that can be channelled through the force field when activated. The character is a graduate student in physics.

In other media
 A variation of Force appears in the Iron Man: Armored Adventures episode "Armor Wars". This version is a member of Obadiah Stane's Guardsmen and a former Maggia enforcer.
 A variation of Clay Wilson appears in The Punisher, portrayed by Tim Guinee. He attempts to care for his son Lewis (portrayed by Daniel Webber), a discharged Army veteran who suffers from PTSD, despite his resistance.

References

External links
 

Characters created by Don Heck
Characters created by Steve Gerber
Comics characters introduced in 1972
Marvel Comics scientists
Marvel Comics superheroes
Marvel Comics supervillains